The Testacelloidea are a superfamily of air-breathing land snails and slugs, terrestrial gastropod mollusks in the suborder Helicina of the order Stylommatophora .

Taxonomy
The families within the Testacelloidea are as follows:
Family Testacellidae Gray, 1840
This taxonomy was based on the study by Nordsieck, published in 1986, and the publication by Schileyko in 2000.

The following families, previously categorized within the Testacelloidea, were transferred to the superfamily Oleacinoidea H. Adams & A. Adams, 1855 in 2017.
Family Oleacinidae H. Adams & A. Adams, 1855
Family Spiraxidae H. B. Baker, 1939

References

Stylommatophora
Taxa named by John Edward Gray